Sailor & I, real name Alexander Sjödin, is a singer, producer and multi-instrumentalist from Stockholm, Sweden.

Known for his unique voice and instrumentation Sailor & I's work has received critical acclaim from the likes of BBC Radio 1, Resident Advisor, Magnetic Magazine, and KEXP-FM.

His 2012 single Tough Love, released on Black Butter Records features powerful string arrangements and has been compared to artists such as Bon Iver, The xx and Active Child. Having played instruments since he was a child, Sailor & I's music has been described as deep and dream-like by MixMag where his debut EP release Tough Love received praise in 2012.

Alongside previous releases on The Invention of Loneliness, Life and Death and Black Butter Records, Sailor & I's songs have also been remixed by Âme, Eric Prydz, Kidnap Kid and Joris Voorn. As well as his work as a vocalist, Sjödin has also collaborated in the studio with electronic artists such as Adriatique and Nic Fanciulli, and is known for his unique voice and emotive style.

Sailor & I's Turn Around remix by AME struck a chord with a large audience, with blogs such as Resident Advisor, The Line of Best Fit and Mixmag rating it as one of their Top 10 tracks of the Summer, alongside the song spending several weeks in the Beatport chart.

In 2015, Sailor & I took his live show on tour, playing festivals such as Open Space Festival in Paris, Electrowerkz in London, Pacha in Dubai, Poplands Festival in Sweden and many more across Europe. As well as drawing influence from elements of Jazz, Rock, Classical and Punk in his music, Sjödin describes his work as a form of escapism from reality, and strives to "fill the void with sounds and have the sounds create emotion in return".

Discography

References 

Living people
Swedish pop singers
Swedish record producers
Swedish multi-instrumentalists
Swedish electronic musicians
Black Butter Records artists
Year of birth missing (living people)